SJS may refer to:

Medicine
 Schwartz–Jampel syndrome, a genetic disease
 Stevens–Johnson syndrome, a skin disorder
 Swyer-James syndrome, a lung disorder

Organisations
 San Jacinto Seminary, Philippines
 San Jose Sharks, NHL hockey team
 Shanghai Japanese School, China
 St. John's School (Texas), Houston, US
 Student Job Search, New Zealand

Other
 Scientific jury selection
 St. James Street railway station, London (National Rail station code)